Durieu is a French surname and may refer to:

People
Michel Charles Durieu de Maisonneuve -  (7 December 1796 – 20 February 1878) was a French soldier and botanist 
Pierre-Paul Durieu, O.M.I. (December 4, 1830 – June 1, 1899)  was a Roman Catholic missionary and the first Bishop of New Westminster, the original diocese for British Columbia
Jean Louis Marie Eugène Durieu (1800–1874) (1800–1874) was an early French nude photographer

Places
Durieu, British Columbia, Canada, located northeast of Mission, British Columbia, named for Bishop Durieu.